Tillandsia didisticha is a species of flowering plant in the Bromeliaceae family. It is native to Bolivia and Brazil.

Cultivars
 Tillandsia 'Burnt Fingers'

References

BSI Cultivar Registry Retrieved 11 October 2009

didisticha
Flora of Bolivia
Flora of Brazil
Taxa named by John Gilbert Baker
Taxa named by Charles Jacques Édouard Morren